Johann Peter Cavallo (23 December 1819 – 19 April 1892) was a German organist, pianist and composer of Italian origin and active in France.

Life
Born in Munich, Cavallo settled in Paris around 1842, where he was organist in the churches of St. Vincent de Paul, St. Germain-des-Prés and St. Nicolas des Champs between 1851 and 1863. He became famous as a pianist in the 1850s. He published, among others, Veillées des salons, a monthly sheet music magazine of short piano pieces of his own compositions in association with choirmaster Frédéric Viret.

Selected works
Valse rustique, Op. 24
Le Crépuscule, Op. 33
Un Dernier jour d'hiver, Op. 46
Mazurka, Op. 47
La Tristesse, Op. 48
Fandango, Op. 49
Le Vertige, Op. 50 
Pensée fugitive, Op. 56
Galop des Sylphes, Op. 57
Près la fontaine du loup, Op. 61

References

Attribution
This article is based on the translation of the corresponding article of the French Wikipedia. A list of contributors can be found there at the History section.

External links

1819 births
1892 deaths
19th-century classical composers
19th-century German male musicians
German expatriates in France
German male classical composers
German male organists
German organists
German people of Italian descent
German Romantic composers
Musicians from Munich
Sacred music composers
19th-century organists